"I Love Rocky Road" is a song by "Weird Al" Yankovic about a man's obsession with rocky road ice cream. It is a parody of the 1981 Joan Jett and the Blackhearts' cover version of the British band Arrows' 1975 song, "I Love Rock 'n' Roll", originally sung and written by Alan Merrill.

Track listing
 "I Love Rocky Road" – 2:35
 "Happy Birthday" – 2:26

Music video
The music video was the directorial debut of Dror Soref and parodies the "I Love Rock 'n Roll" music video, with these differences from the original:

It takes place in an ice cream parlor, rather than a tavern.
It was shot in color rather than black and white.
It was videotaped rather than filmed.
In "I Love Rock 'n Roll", Joan Jett says "Ow!" twice. In "I Love Rocky Road", Weird Al says "Ow!" in reaction to an ice cream-induced brain freeze; the second time, he says "Ow!" in reaction to a kid biting his leg.
Dr. Demento makes a cameo appearance as a cashier.
While Al is playing his accordion, the cover photo for the single can be seen.
Yankovic wears a black leather jacket with the I Love Lucy logo, referencing Yankovic's first music video, "Ricky".
The "ice cream" used in the video is actually mashed potatoes, since real ice cream would melt under stage lights.
When Yankovic sings the line "If I get fat and lose my teeth, that's fine with me," he smiles to reveal all his teeth appear to have either fallen out or are rotten.

Chart positions

Rerecording
In 2022, for the film WEIRD: The Al Yankovic Story, Yankovic rerecorded the track as well as four others. In the film, Yankovic first plays the song in a bar. Different from the album version, it starts out with just Yankovic and the accordion, and near the end of the first verse Jim Kimo West, Steve Jay, and Jon Bermuda Schwartz spontaneously join in on guitar, bass, and drums. After the song is finished, Dr. Demento, who was in the audience, comes up to Yankovic and asks to be his agent, to which Yankovic says yes.

See also
List of singles by "Weird Al" Yankovic
List of songs by "Weird Al" Yankovic

References

External links

1983 songs
1983 singles
"Weird Al" Yankovic songs
Songs with lyrics by "Weird Al" Yankovic
American hard rock songs
Ice cream